Abla Farhoud (1945 – December 1, 2021) was a Lebanese-born Canadian writer who lived in Quebec.

Life 
Farhoud was born in the village of Ain-Hirsché and came with her family to Montreal in 1951. In her late teens, she became a comedian, performing on Radio-Canada television. She returned to Lebanon with her family in 1965. Then, in 1969, Farhoud went to Paris, where she studied theatre at the Université de Vincennes à Paris. She returned to Quebec in 1973 and earned a master's degree in theatre from the Université du Québec à Montréal. Her play La Possession du Prince received the Prix de Théâtre et Liberté from the French Société des Auteurs et Compositeurs Dramatiques. Her writing incorporates Quebec slang "joual", French, colloquial French, colloquial Lebanese-Arabic, English and Arabic.

Her son Mathieu Farhoud-Dionne is a member of the hip hop group Loco Locass.

Selected works

Plays 
 Quand j'étais grande (1983), translated into English as When I was grown up by Jill MacDougall
 Les Filles du 5-10-15¢ (1993), translated into English as The Girls from the Five and Ten by Jill MacDougall 
 La Possession du prince (1993)
 Jeux de patience (1994), translated into English as Game of Patience by Jill MacDougall
 Quand le vautour danse (1997), translated into English as Birds of Prey by Jill MacDougall
 Les Rues de l'alligator (1998)
 Maudite machine (1999)

Novels 
 Le bonheur a la queue glissante (1998), received the Prix France-Québec
 Splendide solitude (2001)
 Le fou d'Omar (2005)
 Le Sourire de la Petite Juive (2011), translated into English as Hutchison Street by Judith Weisz Woodworth (2018)
 Au grand soleil cachez vos filles (2017)
 Le Dernier des snoreaux (2019)
 Havre-Saint-Pierre, pour toujours (2022)

References 

1945 births
2021 deaths
Writers from Quebec
Canadian women dramatists and playwrights
Canadian novelists in French
Canadian women novelists
Lebanese emigrants to Canada
20th-century Canadian dramatists and playwrights
20th-century Canadian novelists
20th-century Canadian women writers
21st-century Canadian dramatists and playwrights
21st-century Canadian novelists
21st-century Canadian women writers
Canadian dramatists and playwrights in French